The Lauritz H. and Emma Smith House is a historic house in Draper, Utah, >United States, that is listed on the National Register of Historic Places (NRHP).

Description
The house is located at 12423 South Relation Street and was built in stages from 1884 to 1947. It has also been known as the Robert L. and Doris B. Smith House.  

It was owned and mostly built by Lauritz Heber Smith, son of Lauritz Smith, who was one of the earliest settlers of Draper.  It is historic for its association with the Smith family and has good integrity of its many stages of development.  It has two outbuildings, one being a c.1885 stone granary.

It was listed on the NRHP February 1, 2006.

See also

 National Register of Historic Places listings in Salt Lake County, Utah
 Rinckel Mansion, Carson City, Nevada, another NRHP-listed work by Charles H. Jones
 Lauritz Smith House, Draper, also NRHP-listed

References

External links

Houses on the National Register of Historic Places in Utah
Victorian architecture in Utah
Houses completed in 1884
Houses in Salt Lake County, Utah
National Register of Historic Places in Salt Lake County, Utah
Buildings and structures in Draper, Utah